Potentilla hyparctica, commonly known as Arctic Cinquefoil, is a species of flowering plant belonging to the family Rosaceae.

Its native range is Subarctic, Afghanistan to Central Asia and Himalaya.

References

hyparctica